Games is a compact disc by the University of Northern Iowa Jazz Band One recorded in the studio with one cut recorded live at the 1998 Montreux Jazz Festival.  This was their 7th CD release in as many years.  This group has been consistently recognized as one of the top collegiate jazz ensembles in the country having won numerous Down Beat awards and accolades from music industry professionals.   "Bob Washut has a magical way with these kids.   Each time I hear one of his groups, I'm even more blown way than the last time."

Background 
In May 1999 the Games CD was the winner of 1999 Down Beat Magazine Student Music Performance Award and also recognized in the International Association for Jazz Education Journal with Dr. Herb Wong's International Association for Jazz Education Blue Chip Jazz Award.  In January 2000, Down Beat Magazine featured an article entitled, "The Best Jazz CDs of the 90's".   All CDs that received 5- and 4 1/2-star reviews in the 1990s were listed; UNI Jazz Band One was the only university big band to receive two 5-star reviews.   The group toured Europe and played at the North Sea Jazz Festival  and Montreux Jazz Festival in July 1998; one of the cuts from the Games CD was recorded there at Montreux.   Music from Games was prominently featured in Europe during several performances.

Track listing 
Track Listing:

Recording Sessions 
 May 11/12, 1998 at Catamount Recording Studio, Cedar Falls, IA (all except track #10)
 July 6, 1998 at the Montreux Jazz Festival (track #10)

Musicians 
Director: Dr. Robert Washut
Woodwinds: Todd Munnik, Rick Stone, Dustin Bear, Jay Ramsey, Jeff Schafer
Trumpets: Dan Zager, Willie Garza, Eric Miller, Dave Lisik, Adam Lauritsen
Trombones: Mike Berven, Paul Rappaport, B.J. Kleene, Andrew Pratt
Rhythm section: Steve Shanley, acoustic and electric piano; Mike Cramer, guitar; Dave Altemeier, acoustic and electric bass; Jason Hastie, drums
Guest soloists: Jack Graham, clarinet (Somewhere), Randy Hogancamp, vibes and percussion (El Pajarito), Sarah Barber, mezzo-soprano (The Cage), Meridie Williams, horn (Butter)

Production 

 Recording engineer, mixing, and mastering: Studio - July 20/21, 1998 by Tom Tatman, Jon Chamberlain and Bob Washut.  Live - Tom Barry
 Liner Notes: Robert Washut and Bobby Shew
 Cover art: Audrey Schroeder
 Photographs: Jeff Martin

Works from the compact disc 

The works from the compact disc are wide-ranging and reflect the eclectic and innovative teaching that Dr. Robert Washut and the UNI Music School faculty promote.  Other faculty and regional artists are collaborated with on the CD to include the original version of Charles Ives' vocal work The Cage (sung by Sarah Barber) which is used as the intro to Dr. Jack Cooper's arrangement of the work for jazz orchestra.   The UNI professor of clarinet Jack Graham is used as a soloist by Bob Washut on his chart on Leonard Bernstein's Somewhere.  The selections Jeep's Blues (Duke Ellington) and Every Tub (Count Basie) point to the well rooted traditions of jazz taught in the curriculum at UNI.   Numerous student works are featured on the recording also.

Reception

References

External links

1998 albums
Jazz albums by American artists